The Anglican Church of St Mary in Charlton Mackrell, Somerset, England was built in the 13th century. It is a Grade II* listed building.

History

The church was built in the 13th century and restored in the 1790s and 1840s. The tracery of the window of the transept was installed about 1330, however the original glass is no longer in place.

The 1840 restoration included the removal of the singing gallery and extensive reconstruction and the addition of a vestry on the north side.

The parish is part of the benefice of Somerton with the Charltons and Kingsdon within the Diocese of Bath and Wells.

Architecture

The hamstone building has slate roofs. The chancel has corner buttresses as does the south transept. The tower has gargoyles on the outside and six bells within.

Inside the church is a 13th-century circular font, while most of the decoration and stained glass is from the 19th century Victorian restoration.

See also  
 List of ecclesiastical parishes in the Diocese of Bath and Wells

References

Grade II* listed buildings in South Somerset
Grade II* listed churches in Somerset
Church of England church buildings in South Somerset